The 1937 Cupa României Final was the fourth final of Romania's most prestigious football cup competition. It was disputed between Ripensia Timişoara and Rapid București, and was won by Rapid București after a game with 6 goals. It was the second cup for Rapid, and the first of six consecutive successes.

Match details

See also 
List of Cupa României finals

References

External links
Romaniansoccer.ro

1937
Cupa
Romania